Gerhard Dommrich (17 July 1932 – 5 May 2014) was a German sports shooter. He competed in the 25 metre pistol event at the 1968 Summer Olympics for East Germany.

References

External links
 

1932 births
2014 deaths
German male sport shooters
Olympic shooters of East Germany
Shooters at the 1968 Summer Olympics
People from Nordhausen, Thuringia
Sportspeople from Thuringia